Batman: Gotham Knights – Gilded City is an American comic book published by DC Comics. The six-issue limited series—written by Evan Narcisse and illustrated by ABEL—is a tie-in prequel to the video game Gotham Knights (2022), the premise revolving around Batman's final case before his death. It began publishing on October 25, 2022.

Premise 
A mysterious virus has infected Gotham City, turning its citizens into rabid, yellow-irised maniacs driven to looting, theft, and bursts of anger. As Batman and his Gotham Knights—consisting of his protégés Nightwing, Batgirl, Robin, and Red Hood—try to contain and stop the outbreak, their search for more information about the virus leads them to uncover the story of the Runaway, an early Gotham vigilante who dealt with a similar outbreak in the 1800s.

Publication 
The six-issue comic book limited series Batman: Gotham Knights – Gilded City was written by Evan Narcisse and illustrated by ABEL. Batman: Gotham Knights – Gilded City was officially announced at San Diego Comic-Con in July 2022. It is a tie-in prequel to the video game Gotham Knights (2022). Batman: Gotham Knights – Gilded City began publishing by DC Comics on October 25, 2022, which is also the exact same date the game will be released. In addition to the United States, Batman: Gotham Knights – Gilded City will also be published simultaneously in the following territories: Brazil, France, Germany, Italy, Mexico and Spain. The comic book series will be distributed as both individual issues and a hardcover collected edition, the latter scheduled to be released in all the aforementioned territories on July 25, 2023, while a collected edition will be available in Poland at the same time. Each issue of the limited series will come with a code for a Gotham Knights in-game item, as well as a seventh item given to those who purchase all six issues of the comic book.

Issues

See also 
 List of prequels

References 

2022 comics debuts
2022 in comics
American comics
Batman storylines
Batman titles
Comics based on video games
Comic book limited series
Comics publications
DC Comics limited series
DC Comics titles
Prequel comics
Superhero comics
Viral outbreaks in comics
Works based on Warner Bros. video games